Chantal Škamlová and Tereza Smitková were the defending champions but Škamlová chose not to participate. Smitková played alongside Tereza Mihalíková, but lost in the first round to Lara Salden and Daniela Vismane.

Carolina Meligeni Alves and Sarah Beth Grey won the title, defeating Mana Kawamura and Funa Kozaki in the final, 6–4, 3–6, [13–11].

Seeds

Draw

Draw

References
Main Draw

Zubr Cup - Doubles